Walter Silva Bakouma Sitou, known as Walter Bakouma (born November 14, 1980 in Mvouti) is a Congolese professional footballer. Currently, he plays in the Championnat de France amateur for SP MAZIERES.

He played 11 games and scored 3 goals for the Congo national football team.Champions avec Sp Mazieres saison 2021-2022

External links
 

1980 births
Living people
Republic of the Congo footballers
Republic of the Congo international footballers
Republic of the Congo expatriate footballers
Expatriate footballers in France
Les Herbiers VF players
Le Puy Foot 43 Auvergne players
Association football midfielders